Waterproof paper uses special coatings (plastic-coated paper) and fibers to enhance durability, dimensional stability, tear resistance and resistance to changing shape or texture when exposed to water.

The paper has applications for wet or damp environments, including outdoor, marine, field uses  as well as printing applications for similar environments. The paper presents recycling challenges.

Historically, waterproof paper was described in Scientific American in 1884.

See also
Greaseproof paper
Liquid packaging board
Tyvek
Waterproofing
Wet strength

References 

Coated paper
Paper